Commonwealth Coast Football (CCC Football) was a single-sport athletic conference that competed in football in the NCAA's Division III. It began play as CCC Football in 2017 after the New England Football Conference (NEFC) was renamed following the 2016 season. CCC Football was administered by the Commonwealth Coast Conference.

The conference competed under the NEFC banner from 1965 through the 2016 season. Member teams are located in New England.

Before an NEFC conference split that took effect with the 2013 season, the NEFC was divided into the Boyd Division and the Bogan Division, with the division champions competing in Division III football's only season-ending conference championship game.

After the 2012 season, the NEFC split, with the seven Massachusetts state institutions and Plymouth State playing in the MASCAC for football. The conference's automatic bid to the NCAA Division III playoffs continued to be held by the eight remaining members: Curry, Endicott, Maine Maritime, MIT, Nichols, Salve Regina, Coast Guard, and Western New England. In the 12 seasons the NEFC hosted a championship game between its two division winners, these remaining eight members accounted for 16 of the 24 championship game participants and 8 of 12 conference champions.

The decision to rename the NEFC was made in October 2015, as the Commonwealth Coast Conference announced that it would add football by effectively absorbing the NEFC as a single-sport conference known as Commonwealth Coast Football, starting with the 2017–18 school year. Accordingly, the 2016 season was the last for the NEFC under its long-standing name and acronym.

The CCC and Commonwealth Coast Football unveiled a new family of logos during a June 2019 visual rebrand.

Due to changes in NCAA Division III legislation regarding the number of members required for a conference to receive an automatic qualifier (AQ), football was incorporated into the multi-sport Commonwealth Coast Conference in 2022, eliminating the need for the football-only league.

NEFC and CCC Football Membership evolution

1965 – The New England Football Conference is founded by charter members Curry, Bridgewater State and Maine Maritime.

1971 – Plymouth State and New England College become conference members.

1972 – Nichols College and Boston State become conference members.

1972 – New England College suspends football program following '72 season; Mass. Maritime Academy becomes conference member.

1973 – Framingham State and New Haven become conference members.

1979 – Western Connecticut State becomes conference member.

1981 – Western New England College becomes conference member.

1981 – New Haven leaves conference, moves to Division II.

1981 – Boston State suspends football program following '81 season.

1982 – Westfield State becomes conference member.

1985 – Fitchburg State and Worcester State become conference members.

1985 – Western Connecticut leaves conference to pursue independent schedule.

1987 – UMass Lowell becomes conference member in 1987, initiating a split into two six-team divisions with divisional winners meeting in championship playoff game.

1988 – UMass Boston and UMass Dartmouth become conference members.

1988 – Western New England leaves conference following '88 season.

1992 – Plymouth State and UMass Lowell join the Freedom Football Conference; Curry and Nichols join the Eastern Collegiate Football Conference.

1992 – The conference now numbers nine colleges that play a round robin schedule.

1997 – Five new members begin conference play in 1998: Curry, Nichols, MIT, Salve Regina and WNEC. The 14-team conference had two 7-team divisions.

1999 – Bridgewater State (10–0) receives first automatic qualification to NCAA playoffs.

2000 – The first Championship game in the 14-team Conference is scheduled. Wal*Mart agrees to sponsor the game. The Divisions are renamed with the Red being the Bogan Division and the Blue becoming the Boyd Division named after the NEFC's first two commissioners. Bridgewater State defeats Salve Regina 27–24 for the championship. UMass Boston drops football.

2001 – The Bogan Division plays with only six teams while the Boyd continues with seven. Endicott College begins a football program and is admitted into the Boyd Division beginning with the 2003 season.

2004 – A Most Valuable Player Award is established for the NEFC Championship Game and is named the William Mottola Award in honor of the long-time conference commissioner.

2005 – Plymouth State University and the United States Coast Guard Academy are admitted as members for play beginning in the 2006 season. Plymouth enters the Boyd Division and Coast Guard Academy competes in the Bogan Division.  The Conference decides that the Championship Game will be played at the campus of the Bogan Division winner in even numbered years and on the field of the Boyd Division champion in odd numbered years.

2007 – Curry College becomes the first NEFC team to win an NCAA Division III Championship Tournament game, defeating Hartwick College 42–21.

2008 – The NEFC qualifies two teams for the NCAA Division III Championship Tournament for the first time.  Conference champion Plymouth State University receives the automatic bid, and Curry College receives an at-large bid.

2010 – Maine Maritime Academy sets a new NCAA Division III season rushing record with 5189 yards in 11 games.  The Mariners miss the all-Division mark set by the University of Oklahoma in 1971 by eight yards.

2011 – Massachusetts State College Athletic Conference institution presidents decide to form a MASCAC football league, which consists of nine schools, and the league champion is awarded an automatic berth to the NCAA D-III Football National Tournament. Bridgewater State University, Fitchburg State University, Framingham State University, Massachusetts Maritime Academy, Westfield State University, and Worcester State University are the six core schools deciding to join the new MASCAC conference. Also, Plymouth State University, UMass-Dartmouth, and Western Connecticut State also join the MASCAC conference as flagship members, effectively in 2013.

2012 – The NEFC qualifies two teams for the NCAA Division III National Tournament for the second time in league history. Framingham State (10–1) won the NEFC Championship and received the automatic bid, while Bridgewater State (9–1) received an at-large bid. Framingham State lost in the First Round, 20–19 to Cortland State (NY), while Bridgewater State also lost in the First Round, 44–14 to Widener University (PA).

2013 – Retired Bridgewater State University Director of Athletics John Harper is named Commissioner of the Conference

2014 – The Conference Championship traveling trophy is named for former Maine Maritime Academy Director of Athletics and football coach Bill Mottola. Mottola was NEFC Commissioner from 1997 to 2007 and was affiliated with the conference for four decades.

2015 – Maine Maritime Academy, Massachusetts Institute of Technology, and the United States Coast Guard Academy announce plans to leave the NEFC following the 2016 season to compete in the NEWMAC, which begins sponsoring football as a championship sport in 2017.

2015 – Gregg Kaye, Commissioner of the Commonwealth Coast Conference, is named NEFC Commissioner.

2016 – The NEFC completes its final season of play under the NEFC name. Curry, Endicott, Nichols, Salve Regina, and Western New England compete in a renamed NEFC known as Commonwealth Coast Football (CCC Football) in succeeding years. Becker joins as an associate member in 2017 and the University of New England adds a football program and becomes CCC Football's seventh football member in 2018. As a renamed NEFC, CCC Football continues to receive automatic qualification to the NCAA Division III Championship Tournament.

2017 – The NEFC begins play as Commonwealth Coast Football and continues to operate as a single-sport conference administered by the Commonwealth Coast Conference.

2019 – Husson joins as an associate member.

2021 – Becker ceases operations.

2022 - Football fully incorporated into the CCC sport sponsorship, rendering CCC Football a defunct league.

Member schools

Current members

Former NEFC/CCC Football members

The years of departure listed are the calendar years in which each school left the conference. Because football is a fall sport, the year of departure is the calendar year after the last season of competition.

Membership timeline

Primary conferences
When the conference operated under the NEFC name, its teams competed in other primary multi-sport conferences.

References

External links